The Battle of Dolinskoye (Dolinskoe, Dolinsky), which took place 25 kilometers northwest of the Chechen capital of Grozny, was the first major ground engagement of the First Chechen War.

Battle 
The battle began on 12 December 1994, when six officers (including two colonels) and 13 enlisted men of the Russian Airborne Troops died in a surprise 9K51 Grad multiple rocket launcher attack on an advancing column of armored vehicles of the 106th Airborne Division and 56th Airborne Brigade. The Russian side immediately retaliated with a helicopter gunship and ground attack aircraft airstrikes on the Chechen positions.

Aftermath 
By 22 December 1994, Dolinskoye continued to hold out against Russian fire. The Russians lost 21 soldiers killed in the initial attack and admitted losing up to 200 men in the overall battle, according to the Chechen commander Hussein Ikshanov.

References

External links 
 Scrambling for cover as gunfire fills the sky, The Guardian, December 13, 1994

Dolinskoye
Dolinskoye
1994 in Russia
Dolinskoye
December 1994 events in Europe